Black and White Classics is the fourth volume of the Television's Greatest Hits series of compilation albums by TVT Records. The album catalog was later acquired by The Bicycle Music Company. In September 2011, Los Angeles-based Oglio Records announced they were releasing the Television's Greatest Hits song catalog after entering into an arrangement The Bicycle Music Company. A series of 9 initial "6-packs" including some of the songs from the album has been announced for 2011.

Track listing 
A1 Astro Boy
A2 Roger Ramjet
A3 The Mighty Hercules
A4 The Gumby Show
A5 Beany and Cecil
A6 Tennessee Tuxedo and His Tales
A7 Quick Draw McGraw
A8 Wally Gator
A9 King Leonardo and His Short Subjects
A10 The Big World of Little Adam
A11 Kukla, Fran and Ollie ("Here We Are, Hop, Hop, Hop")
A12 Soupy Sales
A13 Captain Midnight
B1 Make Room For Daddy ("Danny Boy" (AKA "Londonderry Air"))
B2 Father Knows Best
B3 My Little Margie
B4 The Adventures of Ozzie and Harriet
B5 Hazel
B6 Our Miss Brooks ("Whistling Bells")
B7 Karen
B8 The Real McCoys
B9 Lassie
B10 Walt Disney's Wonderful World of Color
B11 Davy Crockett, King of the Wild Frontier ("The Ballad of Davy Crockett")
C1 The Life and Legend of Wyatt Earp
C2 Gunsmoke ("The Old Trail")
C3 Lawman
C4 26 Men
C5 Colt .45
C6 Cheyenne
C7 Bronco
C8 The Legend of Jesse James
C9 Hopalong Cassidy ("Hopalong Cassidy March")
C10 The Everglades
C11 Adventures In Paradise
C12 Victory At Sea ("Song of the High Seas")
C13 Dr. Kildare ("Three Stars Will Shine Tonight")
C14 Medic
D1 Burke's Law
D2 Highway Patrol
D3 M Squad
D4 The Detectives Starring Robert Taylor
D5 The Untouchables
D6 The Fugitive
D7 Checkmate
D8 Tightrope
D9 Mr. Lucky
D10 Bourbon Street Beat
D11 Pete Kelly's Blues
D12 Asphalt Jungle
D13 Mr. Broadway ("Blues For Mr. Broadway")
D14 Johnny Staccato
D15 Naked City ("Somewhere In the Night")
D16 The Twenty-First Century
D17 The French Chef
D18 Candid Camera
D19 You Bet Your Life ("Hooray For Captain Spaulding")
D20 Amos 'n' Andy ("Angel's Serenade")
D21 The Abbott and Costello Show
D22 Laurel and Hardy Laughtoons ("Kooky Koo-Koo")
D23 The Lawrence Welk Show ("Bubbles In the Wine")
D24 Ted Mack's Original Amateur Hour
D25 Miss America Pageant ("There She Is, Miss America")
D26 The Red Skelton Show ("Holiday For Strings")
D27 The Bob Hope Show ("Thanks For the Memory")

References

External links
Television's Greatest Hits at Oglio Records

1996 compilation albums
TVT Records compilation albums
Television's Greatest Hits albums